Luka Potočar is a Slovenian sport climber. He participated at the 2021 IFSC Climbing World Championships, winning the silver medal in the lead event.

See also
List of grade milestones in rock climbing
History of rock climbing
Rankings of most career IFSC gold medals

References

External links 

Living people
Place of birth missing (living people)
Slovenian rock climbers
IFSC Climbing World Championships medalists
21st-century Slovenian people
2001 births
IFSC Climbing World Cup overall medalists